CE Jenlai, also known simply as Jenlai, is an Andorran football team based in the village of Escaldes-Engordany. The club currently plays in Segona Divisió.

History
CE Jenlai were founded in 2008 under the name of Atlètic Amèrica. During the 2008–09 season the club was renamed CE Jenlai. The Andorran team was playing in Segona Divisió until 2011, for three consecutive seasons. After two seasons, in 2013 the club returned to Segona Divisió recording a notable season finishing 2nd and being able to compete at the promotion play-offs. They lost 1–6 in aggregate against Inter Club d'Escaldes. Two seasons later Jenlai achieved the promotion to Primera Divisió after winning the Segona Divisió title in 2016.

Identity
The team was mostly composed and founded by Peruvian players. Their current club's crest, introduced in 2013, is a variation of the Peruvian coat of arms.

Honours
Segona Divisió:
Winners: 2015–16
Runners-up: 2013–14

Current squad
As of 20 November 2016

References

Jenlai
2008 establishments in Andorra
Association football clubs established in 2008